Beru (Akkadian) or  (Sumerian) is a word denoting a unit of time consisting of two hours. There were twelve Berus in a dayDanna was first used around 2400 BC

Change in length and decline 
In Hellenistic times the Danna was halved with the introduction of the temporal hours and the number of daylight hours increased from twelve to twenty-four. The conversion was based on the ancient Egyptian precursors of the 24 seasonally - equal hours. A 24-hour division of the day could not be proven in inscriptions on Babylonian tablets, which is why the Babylonians cannot be used as the originators of the 24-hour division of the day.

See Also 

 Unequal hours
 Equinoctial hours

References

History of timekeeping
de:Danna (Mesopotamien)